Physical Layer Convergence Protocol is the physical layer protocol of several data transmission networks. It is used in the 802.11 standard.

References

External links
Standards for IEEE 802
Physical layer convergence protocol (plcp) packet structure for multiple-input-multiple-output (mimo) communication systems

Data transmission
IEEE 802
Physical layer protocols